Steelhead, or occasionally steelhead trout, is the common name of the anadromous form of the coastal rainbow trout  or Columbia River redband trout (O. m. gairdneri, also called redband steelhead). Steelhead are native to cold-water tributaries of the Pacific basin in Northeast Asia and North America. Like other sea-run (anadromous) trout and salmon, steelhead spawn in freshwater, smolts migrate to the ocean to forage for several years and adults return to their natal streams to spawn.  Steelhead are iteroparous, although survival is approximately 10–20%.

Description 

The freshwater form of the steelhead is the rainbow trout (Oncorhynchus mykiss). The difference between these forms of the species is that steelhead migrate to the ocean and return to freshwater tributaries to spawn, whereas non-anadromous rainbow trout do not leave freshwater. They can live up to 11 years and spawn multiple times. The body of the steelhead trout is silvery and streamlined with a rounder head. There are black dots and a red or pink stripe running horizontally down the sides of the fish. This silver color and round head is what gives the steelhead its name.

A number of distinct population segments of steelhead are endangered or threatened across the United States, mostly caused by the blocking of waterways by the construction of dams. Human interaction has had considerable consequences on reducing the population of steelhead trout.

Characteristics 
Steelhead currently support or have historically supported fisheries across Northern California, and thus they hold "economic as well as cultural value" (Moyle, Israel, & Purdy, 2008). Contrary to popular belief, the California Steelhead is a coastal variation of the same species of fish as the Rainbow Trout, Oncorhynchus mykiss; "rainbow trout are the 'landlocked' version, and remain in freshwater throughout their life" (King County, 2016). An ocean-going variety, the Steelhead, or Oncorhynchus mykiss irideus has developed unique adaptive characteristics that distinguish this fish from its common counterpart and have allowed a wider distribution of this species across the Pacific Northwest, including the coastal regions of California. In fact, "coastal rainbow trout is the most widely-distributed native trout form" (CA.gov). Among other necessary biological utilities fulfilled by this species, Steelhead Trout "are also strong indicators of the condition of California’s streams; large self-sustaining populations of native salmon and trout are found where streams are in reasonably good condition" (Moyle, Israel, & Purdy, 2008). A chrome underside and olive-grey back reminiscent to that of a steel beam are attributed as the main defining physical characteristic for which the Steelhead is distinguished and earns its namesake.

The Steelhead is an ocean-going predatory fish with a typical lifespan of four to six years. Like the common rainbow trout, Steelhead predominantly feast on zooplankton when they are young and then transition to eating fish, some rodents, mollusks, and crustaceans. When these fish enter the open ocean, however, their diet typically consists of squid, crustaceans, and small fish including anchovies, herring, and sardines, though the capacity at which this dietary intake occurs is highly contingent upon the geographical region where Steelhead choose to migrate (Salmon Fishing Now). "Rainbow trout and steelhead represent two divergent ecotypes that are genetically identical but separated by life history strategies" (Heath 2001); the unique biological diversity of the Steelhead Trout from that of the Rainbow Trout is determined through a capacity to migrate to the open ocean. Homing behavior is a unique adaptation of Steelhead Trout that allows the fish to migrate to and from freshwater and saltwater bodies on multiple occasions. Through the process of imprinting, Steelhead Trout deposit a chemical indicator "that is specific to their natal stream" (NRC 1996).

Homing behavior 
Perhaps the most interesting and perplexing characteristic of the Steelhead Trout is its homing behavior and the capacity of this species to accurately detect its primary spawning grounds despite venturing to the open ocean and returning to the same freshwater source on numerous occasions throughout their lives. By recording the concentrations of solutes and the chemical profile of a stream through the biological characteristic of a chemical indicator, steelhead "use the position of the sun and magnetic north to navigate towards spawning grounds " after they have fed in the open ocean for 1–4 whole years (Fulton). Even after traveling hundreds of miles, this chemical imprint allows steelhead to identify their precise hatching grounds upon returning to freshwater. According to "A review of the characteristics, habitat requirements, and ecology of the Anadromous Steelhead Trout" by Fulton, "homing creates genetically different subpopulations that differ by basin, stream, and even location within a stream" (Altukhov 2000). According to a study conducted by Heath & Pollard, "significant genetic variation on the individual, tributary, and watershed level occur between Steelhead Trout populations" as a result of this chemical reliance for breeding practices (Heath, 2001). The author concludes that as a result of such biologically accurate homing characteristics, the Steelhead Trout is "uniquely adapted to its environment"; fish populations "are reasonably isolated from fish that spawn in different areas," and therefore "sub-populations may differ by the timing of runs, size of fish, and even behavior patterns" (Heath, 2001). This also influences genetic relatedness between Steelhead Trout populations; interestingly, the author found that the genetic similarity of regional Steelhead trout populations "is correlated with distance" (Heath, 2001).

Spawning 

During spawning, the fish will lay their eggs on gravel bottoms of freshwater tributaries. The female digs out a hole called a redd. She then lays the eggs, and a male fertilizes them. The females will then cover the eggs with the gravel. Depending on the size of the female she may lay up to 9,000 eggs. The female then buries the eggs in a foot of gravel. The eggs remain in the gravel until they hatch. Unlike salmon (which can spawn only once) steelhead may return to the ocean, and come back upstream several times for spawning season.

Fisheries and ecology 

Native Steelhead Trout fisheries in North America range "to the West of the Rockies" across the coastal regions of the United States (National Wildlife Federation). Hatcheries have sprung across the United States, in states such as Idaho, Pennsylvania, and New York, releasing nonnative Steelhead Trout into local waters for sport-fishing, as well as replenishing the overall quantity of Steelhead Trout in the United States. The most prolific and historic fisheries of Steelhead Trout are located in Alaska, Washington, and Oregon. Idaho is home to a thriving inland fishery population as well, with over 20+ hatcheries stocking fish and interacting with the native population across the state's pristine icy rivers and streams. In Northern California, dwindling numbers over the past decades have been subject to overfishing and pollution in areas such as the Russian River and the Sacramento Delta. However, due to reinvigorated conservation efforts bolstering the repopulation of native species in Washington and Oregon, fishermen and Steelhead Trout enthusiasts alike are granted the spoils of a replenishing population of Steelhead in this Northwest region. Hatcheries and native fisheries occupy 12 significant population segments across the Pacific Northwest outlined by NOAA. As a result of urbanization and relatively misdirected conservation efforts in the past, these designated areas remain considerably threatened, some even endangered. However, there is a reason for hope. These significant population segments of Steelhead Trout include:

1. Southern California 

 Endangered

2. California Central Valley 

 Threatened

3. Central California Coast 

 Threatened

4. Lower Columbia River 

 Threatened

5. Middle Columbia River 

 Threatened

6. Northern California 

 Endangered

7. Puget Sound 

 Threatened

8. Snake River Basin 

 Threatened

9. South-Central California Coast 

 Vulnerable

10. Upper Columbia River 

 Threatened

11. Willamette River 

 Threatened

12. Middle Columbia River 

 Experimental Population

—(National Oceanic and Atmospheric Administration, US Department of Commerce)

Conservation in these 12 key population centers for Steelhead Trout is crucial for their survival. The three ecological niche factors of Steelhead Trout include "habitat availability, access to spawning grounds, and the survival of the oceanic and freshwater life-stages" (Fulton). Steelhead Trout occupy a significant role in their endemic environment as their livelihood is highly contingent on water quality and pristine natural environment.

Although not considered a keystone species, Steelhead Trout satisfy a crucial ecological role in their natural environment not only as an indicator species for habitat quality but also as a primary food source for predatory mammals and scavengers, including humans, alike. Because several conditions could determine the ecological success of Steelhead Trout populations, including external conditions related to human encroachment and pollution, Steelhead Trout populations in areas with concentrated human populations have largely struggled. Correlated with a decrease in Steelhead Trout numbers is also a decreased habitat quality in these urbanized areas. 

The human story is uniquely intertwined with steelhead because this specialized trout species occupies immense cultural significance in American natural history. Furthermore, the prospects of this species' survival are highly contingent on our conservation efforts and mitigation techniques.

Freshwater rainbow trout forms have been introduced into the Great Lakes and migrate into tributaries to spawn. These trout are frequently, though incorrectly, referred to as steelhead, as they are non-anadromous. In Tasmania, commercially propagated steelhead are called Ocean Trout.

Importance of water temperature 
The temperature of the water Steelhead swim in is crucial for their development and survival. Salmonoids are considered "poikilotherms", which means that temperature influences their life events, such as spawning. Water temperature is one of the most important environmental influences on the salmonid biology.  Temperature determines when the Steelhead will begin migrating upstream, the time they will spawn and the time the fry will hatch. The development of steelhead eggs are also dependent on a certain temperature of the water. No salmonid species can survive in temperatures exceeding . Unfortunately, in California, there have been longer drier seasons than cold-wet seasons and that will cause an increase in California's river system temperatures.

Parasites and pathogens 
With all the pesticides people put into their yards, all the agriculture that surrounds our water, many pollutants and pathogens enter our watersheds. This can cause numerous environmental factors affecting the organisms that reside in our fresh waters. With an increase in greenhouse gas and high CO2 levels, this can cause an algae bloom and warmer bodies of water. When pH levels are too high it can cause damage internally and externally which eventually kill the steelhead. An increase in water temperature makes Steelhead incapable of handling further stressors and makes them more susceptible to parasites and pathogens. These warmer waters magnify the biotic relationships and increase parasitism. A study was done to explore why Steelhead were experiencing lesions on their bodies in a river of West Virginia and the results showed a correlation of lesions on the fish when water is low, the pH levels were high.

Dam installments 
Due to human involvement, dams have been built and have caused a barrier for Steelhead and other anadromous fish trying to migrate upstream to spawn. Some dams have fish ladders that are engineered to help fish migrate upstream past the dam, some dams have engineered a method of helping them get downward to the ocean, and others that are too tall to have a ladder. Dam-related impacts are the single largest cause of diminished populations of Central Valley salmon and Steelhead relative to pre western settlement conditions. The Cougar Dam in Oregon has historically altered the temperature of the water downstream which altered the time the fish migrated, spawned and when the eggs hatched.  Smolts are at risk if swimming upon warm bodies of water. They are incapable of surviving at that stage of life in too warm of water. Proposed solutions involving these issues are to install more wind turbines and to tear down the dams that are directly impacting the ecology of our river systems. There are methods scientists and engineers have designed to help transport migrating fish over these dams such as a fish ladder or long vertical tubes that go from water to over the dam that essentially pumps water and the fish over the dam.

Natural disasters 
Natural disasters are occurring more frequently due to climate change. Fires being more frequent means more obstacles for these Steelhead to complete their journey back upstream. Fires burning alongside our rivers and watersheds cause river pollution with debris and runoff. These reoccurring fires are also burning key vegetation alongside the rivers and watersheds that keep the water temperature cool while constantly being shaded. Vegetation alongside the water also helps with less evaporation occurring because of less direct sunlight beaming on it.

History and cultivation 
Historically, trout have satisfied a necessary food source for human populations across the Pacific Northwest of the United States and British Columbia. Indigenous populations including the Salish of Middle Columbia River, the southern Okanagan, the Lillooet and Shuswap, the Thompson (N'laka'pamux), the Chilcotin, the Upper Kutenai (Kootenai), the Yukon Indigenous Peoples, the Caribou Inuit, the Eyak, the Micmac (Mi’kmaq), and the Montagnais (Innu) of Lake Melville, Labrador have historically utilized trout as a significant food source (Center for Indigenous Peoples' Nutrition and Environment). In particular, the steelhead is viewed as a prized fish, not only for its high-fat content and succulent orange meat but also for its connection to the native environment. Long-serving as an indicator for water quality, biological diversity, and overall ecosystem health, the steelhead reserves a particular degree of recognition and respect amongst human populations that have historically relied on the diversity of rivers, streams, and oceans for sustenance. Among others, the Southern Okanagan and the Lower Lillooet and Gitksan (Gitxsan) tribes relied on steelhead during the Spring seasons in March and April; the Tahltan tribes cultivated them during mid-March through April and in September; the Coeur d’Alene tribes depended on Steelhead Trout from May through October and November through April; the Upper Lillooet from fall through spring, and finally the Bella Coola (Nuxalk) and Central Coast Salish tribes enjoyed steelhead year-round (Center for Indigenous Peoples' Nutrition and Environment). The Steelhead Trout is celebrated for its service as a main traditional food source for historic indigenous populations. Some tribes, such as the Gitksan and Wet’suwet’en, even considered steelhead as their most important food source (Center for Indigenous Peoples' Nutrition and Environment).

Tribal cultivation techniques 

Traditional cultivation methods of the Steelhead Trout by indigenous tribes included weirs used to re-direct the passage of fish, gaffs, and poles, nets, spears, fish wheels, harpoons, leisters—a three-pronged spear, traps, hooks and through early trolling techniques (Center for Indigenous Peoples' Nutrition and Environment).

The Tahltan 
According to the Center for Indigenous Peoples' Nutrition and Environment, these coastal tribes relied on several cultivation techniques in catching the Steelhead Trout. The Tahltan used spears and weirs, as well as gill nets particularly during a period at the beginning of the 20th Century where weir usage was banned (Center for Indigenous Peoples' Nutrition and Environment). Also, the Tahltan utilized "cylindrical trap baskets and hand nets" and in shallow waters, they employed gaffs with detachable hooking mechanisms (Center for Indigenous Peoples' Nutrition and Environment).

Vancouver Island Nootka (Nuu-chah-nulth) 
For the Nootka of Vancouver Island, men used weirs, traps, leisters, and harpoons to cultivate these unique fish, while the Central Coast Salish utilized several cultivation techniques including harpoons, leisters, gaff hooks, four-pronged spears, dip nets, basket traps, weirs, and trawl nets depending on the width of the stream and water clarity (Center for Indigenous Peoples' Nutrition and Environment).

The Salish tribes 
The Coast Salish caught steelhead using ingenious techniques and employing the natural environment. Fashioning trolling lines out of stinging nettle and U-shaped hooks made from bone, the Salish also used the intermittent tides through a tidal weir, where the movement of incoming tides would flush these fish into small bays and into a river weir-trap, where the fish would be ultimately harpooned or speared in shallow water (Center for Indigenous Peoples' Nutrition and Environment).

The Bella Coola 
The Bella Coola tribes traditionally relied on distinct cultivation techniques which involving cornering the steelhead using two different trapping mechanisms, forcing them to jump into waiting baskets. According to the Center for Indigenous Peoples' Nutrition and Environment, each village of the Bella Coola indigenous peoples tribe possessed an exclusive claim to the trapping and cultivation of steelhead on the Bella Coola River (Center for Indigenous Peoples' Nutrition and Environment).

The Thompson 
Along the Thompson River near Spences Bridge, this tribe utilized the novel attraction of pitch-lamps to lure Steelhead Trout to the surface, where they would ultimately be speared or harpooned, or hooked using traditional hook and bait techniques (Center for Indigenous Peoples' Nutrition and Environment).

Predation and threats 
Steelhead Trout serve a crucial role in the dietary needs for most predatory animals, contingent on the specific habitat and region where these fish are found. Steelhead Trout are tertiary consumers, meaning that they feast on other predatory animals within their local environment such as smaller fish. Predators of the Steelhead Trout include freshwater lampreys, birds such as ospreys and eagles, bears, raccoons, river otters, and humans (National Wildlife Federation). In the open ocean, steelhead is eaten by many species including a variety of sharks species, seals, sea lions, and even orcas (National Wildlife Federation). Aside from these natural predators, the most significant threat facing the Steelhead Trout is unquestionably that of human impact. Human encroachment has led to habitat loss and the overall degradation of the natural environment where Steelhead Trout typically thrived. Increased urbanization and pollution have afflicted these once-pristine Northern California streams, rivers, and ocean-mouths. Areas along the Sonoma Coast and Humboldt County, where steelhead is typically found, have seen less species traffic over time. In Southern California, the future of the Steelhead Trout is in even greater jeopardy. Historical reports and photographed archives of the early 20th century suggest that steelhead were once cultivated across Orange County and even along the Los Angeles River. These fish were once reportedly found in areas such as Steelhead Creek near Dodger Stadium, the Ventura River, the Malibu Creek, and the San Juan Creek in Orange County (California Trout). Populations of Steelhead Trout once extended farther south to San Diego County at the lower San Mateo Creek and lower Santa Margarita River, as well (California Trout).

NOAA highlights habitat degradation as the main threat to Northern California steelhead populations, resulting from "riparian removal, sedimentation, altered instream flows, degradation of water quality, instream wood removal, and poor estuarine habitats" (NOAA). In particular, human activity leading to population decline resulted from "logging, ranching, recreation, mining, habitat blockages, water diversions, artificial propagation, estuarine destructions or modification, flooding, hydropower development, instream habitat problems, lack of data, general land use activities, poaching, predation, recreational angling, urbanization, and water management" (NOAA).

Conservation status 
There have been several conservation programs created since the near extinction of the steelhead in the 1940s. The reduction in population is mainly due to manmade obstructions within river systems. This is usually caused by dams blocking access, or humans changing the river landscape for recreation and access to water. It is estimated that only 500 steelhead trout return to the Southern California watersheds. However, in other areas of the United States, steelhead can be seen as pests because they are an invasive species to the environment.

Southern California 
While numbers are improving in areas of the Pacific Northwest where Steelhead Trout have typically thrived, the California Steelhead Trout is considered a threatened species, and according to Mark Capelli of the National Marine Fisheries Service, the Southern California steelhead are the most endangered of them all (California Trout). According to California Trout, Steelhead Trout populations began to decline in the "late-1940s due mainly to man-made landscape modifications" (California Trout). As a result of damming for flood control, steelhead migration routes from the coast to upstream spawning grounds were increasingly blocked over time (California Trout). Furthermore, largely a result of continued urbanization and to satisfy the needs of human populations in the area, river flows became modified for recreational purposes and a substantial diversion of water occurred over time (California Trout). As a result of widespread habitat loss and fragmentation, Southern California Steelhead populations were officially labeled as an endangered species in 1997 (California Trout). In some areas, a recent sighting of the Steelhead Trout has not occurred in years, and biologists fear the worst. In 2002, the endangered species label was extended from the Malibu Creek down to the border of San Diego and Mexico (California Trout).

Northern California 

A threatened species since 2000, the Northern California steelhead represents a beacon of hope for continued rehabilitation initiatives and growing population numbers in the area. As of 2016, 48,892 Steelhead Trout were reportedly caught (NOAA). Such a population count suggests that this fascinating fish species continue to persevere in Northern California waters. However, to ensure the continued rehabilitation of steelhead populations in Northern California, a positive, directive plan of action for steelhead conservation must occur. According to NOAA, The State of California Fisheries Restoration Grant Program (FRGP) "invested over 250 million dollars and supported approximately 3,500 salmonid restoration projects" (NOAA). Investments in projects improving "fish passage, water quality, instream habitat restoration, watershed monitoring, and education and organizational support" all occupy conservation efforts to improve Northern California steelhead populations (NOAA). According to NOAA, "the percentage of floodplain and in-channel habitat that would need to be restored to detect a 25% increase in salmon and steelhead production was 20%" (NOAA). As it stands, "more than 20% of floodplain and in-channel habitat has been restored due to FRGP" (NOAA). Though these initiatives spell hope for the prospects of Steelhead Trout population rehabilitation, habitat degradation continues to occur at an alarming rate.

Notes

Aaron Fulton. "A Review of the Characteristics, Habitat Requirements, and Ecology of the Anadromous Steelhead Trout (Oncorhynchus Mykiss) in the Skeena Basin," June 15, 2004, 16.

"Coastal Multispecies Plan Volume III: Northern California Steelhead." NOAA Fisheries, 2016. https://www.fisheries.noaa.gov/resource/document/final-coastal-multispecies-recovery-plan-california-coastal-chinook-salmon.

"Coastal Rainbow Trout/ Steelhead." California Department of Fish and Wildlife, October 29, 2016. https://wildlife.ca.gov/Conservation/Fishes/Coastal-Rainbow-Trout-Steelhead.

"Fish Hatcheries." In Fishing in Idaho. Idaho Department of Fish and Game, n.d. https://idfg.idaho.gov/visit/hatchery.

Peter B. Moyle, Joshua A. Israel, and Sabra E. Purdy. "Salmon, Steelhead, and Trout in California: Status of an Emblematic Fauna." California Trout, 2008, 220.

"Rainbow Trout and Steelhead." National Wildlife Federation, n.d. https://www.nwf.org/Educational-Resources/Wildlife-Guide/Fish/Rainbow-Trout-Steelhead.

"Southern Steelhead: A Story of Recovery." California Trout, February 7, 2018. https://caltrout.org/news/southern-steelhead-story-recovery.

"Steelhead Trout." Salmon Fishing Now, 2018. https://www.salmonfishingnow.com/steelhead-trout-biology/.

"Steelhead Trout." In NOAA Fisheries. NATIONAL OCEANIC AND ATMOSPHERIC ADMINISTRATION, n.d. https://www.fisheries.noaa.gov/species/steelhead-trout.

"Steelhead Trout Identification." King County, November 10, 2016. https://www.kingcounty.gov/services/environment/animals-and-plants/salmon-and-trout/identification/steelhead.aspx.

V. Kuhnlein, Harriet, and Murray M. Humphries. "Rainbow Trout (Steelhead Trout)." In Traditional Animal Foods of Indigenous Peoples of Northern North America. Centre for Indigenous Peoples’ Nutrition and Environment, n.d. http://traditionalanimalfoods.org/fish/freshwater/page.aspx?id=6151.

Oncorhynchus
Commercial fish
Fish of the Pacific Ocean
Fish of the Western United States
Cold water fish